Lebanon Transit (LT) is a public transportation service located in Lebanon County, Pennsylvania. It provides bus and paratransit service to Lebanon, Pennsylvania and select communities in the region. Inter-city service is also provided to Hershey, Pennsylvania.

Previously known as County of Lebanon Transit System (COLTS), the system was rebranded Lebanon Transit on May 3, 2010.

Routes
Lebanon Transit operates ten bus routes in their conventional bus service, and three express bus routes.  On Saturdays, a special route is operated outside of the county to Park City Center shopping mall in neighboring Lancaster County.

All bus routes operate on a hub and spoke style network and depart from the Downtown Bus Terminal on Willow Avenue.

Urban routes

1: to Lebanon Valley Mall, Weis Market, Lebanon Plaza, Foodland, Manor Care, Quentin Circle, Norman Dr., Cornwall Rd. 
2: to 8th St., Maple St., Spruce Park, Walmart, Lebanon Village, Lehman St. 
3: to Webster Manor, Town House Apts., Alley Blind Center, Brookside Apartments, N. 10th Street. 
4: to East Lebanon Area, WellSpan Good Samaritan Hospital, Salvation Army Store, Dollar Tree/Home Depot
6: to South 8th St. (GSH Dialysis), VA Medical Center, South Hills Park, Locust St., Good Samaritan Hospital
8: to West Lebanon County, Cleona, Annville, Palmyra, and selected Hershey areas
16: to Lebanon, Cleona, Annville, Palmyra, Hershey, Hershey Park, Grantville & Hollywood Casino at Penn National Race Course 
16C: Late Night service to WellSpan Good Samaritan Hospital, Home Depot, and Walmart 
17: to Park & Ride Shuttle, Giant, Walmart
88: to Cleona, Annville, and DHL

Express routes
Commute King A: to Harrisburg via Cleona, Annville, Palmyra, and Hershey
Commute King B: to Harrisburg via Jonestown and Fort Indiantown Gap
10 Old Forge Road Express: to Jonestown and Old Forge Road

Special route
SP: to Quentin, Manheim, and Park City Center in Lancaster (Saturdays only)

Berks Area Regional Transportation Authority agreement

On September 9, 2013, LT implemented a pilot service with the Berks Area Regional Transportation Authority, in which a new regional service would be offered linking Reading, Lebanon, Hershey and Harrisburg.  The service would use both BARTA and LT buses over the length of the route, and times would be coordinated if a transfer would be necessary between the two agency's buses.  The service is expected to be run for a reasonable trial time period, and expanded if found to be adequately patronized.  The service has hopes of replacing service previously offered by Bieber Tourways, which had abandoned the service on July 1, 2013.

Paratransit

Lebanon Transit operates a paratransit service called LT Paratransit weekdays through the urban and county areas of Lebanon County.  The service is operated as a shared ride service, and requires a reservation after being previously approved through PWD (person with disabilities) or ADA (Americans with Disabilities Act) program guidelines.

References

Bus transportation in Pennsylvania
Transportation in Lebanon County, Pennsylvania
Paratransit services in the United States
Lebanon, Pennsylvania
Municipal authorities in Pennsylvania
Grantville, Pennsylvania
Hershey, Pennsylvania